During the 1989–90 season, Leeds United A.F.C. competed in the Football League Second Division.

Season summary 
In the 1989–90 season, Leeds were promoted to the First Division, having finished as champions of the Second Division on 85 points.

First team squad

Competitions

Football League Second Division

League table

Results 

Source:

FA Cup 

Source:

League Cup 

Source:

Full Members' Cup 

Source:

Notes

References

Leeds United
Leeds United F.C. seasons
Foot